Israel–Cameroon relations are relations between the Republic of Cameroon and the State of Israel. Along with Eritrea, Cameroon is one of two African states that do not recognize the State of Palestine.

Cameroon voted against several anti-Israel UN resolutions, and was the only nation to join Israel in voting against the UN resolution "Assistance to Palestine Refugees".

Cameroon cut ties with Israel from 1973 to 1986 and was one of the first states to restore relations. The government of Cameroon uses Israeli armored vehicles, and Cameroon's Rapid Reaction Force, often shortened (by its French name) to BIR, is equipped and trained by Israel.

Students in Cameroon were granted 11 month visas to travel to Israel and learn about agriculture, while poultry farmers underwent training for poultry production in Israel.

Israelis also trained personnel at six hospitals in Cameroon on how to combat the Ebola virus.

References

 
Cameroon
Israel